The Oshkosh Arena, formerly the Menominee Nation Arena, is a  indoor arena located in Oshkosh, in the U.S. state of Wisconsin. The facility is primarily used for basketball, but has also hosted a handful of conventions and concerts. It serves as the home of the Wisconsin Herd of the NBA G League, which is affiliated with the Milwaukee Bucks of the National Basketball Association. The first event to be held at the arena, a Wisconsin Herd game was on December 1, 2017.

Location and design
The arena is located along the east side of South Main Street, on the former site of the Buckstaff Furniture Company. With a seating capacity of 3,500 spectators, the new arena broke ground on March 29, 2017, with completion slated for late November.

History
On January 25, 2017, the Oshkosh City Council unanimously approved the construction of the $15 million facility. The cost of the construction was privately funded, with the arena being part of a larger development plan for a new housing and commercial area called the Sawdust District, located near Pioneer Drive Park along the shores of Lake Winnebago. On June 13, 2017, the Oshkosh City Council announced that the arena was to receive an additional $250,000 in state-supported funding for improvement of the nearby roadways and infrastructures to improve transit to the facility.

On October 23, 2017, the Menominee Native American tribe announced that they had purchased the naming rights to the arena, giving it the Menominee Nation Arena name.  Terms of the deal were not disclosed.

The owner and operator of the arena, Fox Valley Pro Basketball, Inc. filed bankruptcy on August 19, 2019.  According to Jeff Bollier of Gannett News multiple lawsuits have been filed against the owners. In March 2021 it was announced that the Menominee Tribe were ending their contract for the naming rights as part of their business restructuring due to COVID-19. As of August 19, 2021, the arena began to remove the Menominee Nation name from the Arena.

References

External links

 Official Site

Indoor arenas in Wisconsin
Sports venues in Wisconsin
NBA G League venues
2017 establishments in Wisconsin
Basketball venues in Wisconsin
Sports in Oshkosh, Wisconsin
Wisconsin Herd
Sports venues completed in 2017